Chongqing Technology and Business University station (Chinese: 重庆工商大学站), formerly known as Wugongli station (Chinese: 五公里站), is a station on Line 3 of Chongqing Rail Transit in Chongqing Municipality, China. It is located in Nan'an District. It opened in 2011.

Station structure

References

Railway stations in Chongqing
Railway stations in China at university and college campuses
Railway stations in China opened in 2011
Chongqing Rail Transit stations